"Overpowered" is a song by Irish singer Róisín Murphy from her second studio album of the same name (2007). It was written by Murphy, Paul "Seiji" Dolby and Mike Patto, and produced by the former two. The song was released on 9 July 2007 as the album's lead single. "Overpowered" reached number 149 on the UK Singles Chart on downloads alone, as its physical formats were ineligible to chart.

Single cover
The art director of the single was British graphic designer Scott King and the photographer was Jonathan de Villiers. Murphy is wearing a design by Viktor & Rolf on the cover.

Critical reception
"Overpowered" was met with positive reviews from critics. Jax Spike of About.com described the song as "a perfect ode to melancholic memories that are sung with a seductive baby doll voice with lyrics like 'When I think that I am over you/I'm overpowered' right before a zigzagging electro beat comes into play." Heather Phares of AllMusic stated, "With its sleek beats, bubbling synths, and nagging chorus, 'Overpowered' closely resembles a state-of-the-art pop single, but the way Murphy sings of science and oxytocin over a heart-fluttering harp is unmistakably her."

BBC Music's Sonja D'Cruze referred to the song as "a heady electronic anthem which tells the tale of getting consumed by the lust for an ex-lover, complete with a squelchy bassline and the minimalism of Casio kickdrums which are all secretly lifted by gentle harp and spacey synths. It's an irresistible match of loved-up disco pop which has a crafty reworking of TIGA's 'I Wear My Sunglasses At Night', immediately making it a new classic." Mike Barnes from musicOMH called the song "an unrelenting electro-pop gem that penetrates your skull faster than a high-velocity nail gun." Pitchfork placed "Overpowered" at number 69 on its list of the Top 100 Tracks of 2007, further commenting, "Arty and smartly seductive, 'Overpowered' is a sublime reminder of the glory days of New Pop."

Music video
The music video for "Overpowered" was directed by Jamie Thraves and shows Murphy walking back home from a live gig at night. On her way home, she is seen catching a Leyland Titan bus, buying fish and chips at a restaurant and witnessing a police chase. Upon arriving home, she drinks water in the kitchen, removes clothes from the washing machine, brushes her teeth and ultimately goes to bed. Throughout the video, Murphy wears a black and white-chequered outfit designed by English fashion designer Gareth Pugh; Kylie Minogue would wear the same piece in her "In My Arms" video the following year.

Track listings

UK CD single
"Overpowered" – 5:09
"Foolish" – 3:28
"Sweet Nothings" – 3:45
"Overpowered" (Seamus Haji Remix) – 8:07
"Overpowered" (Kris Menace Remix) – 5:09
"Overpowered" (video) – 4:04

UK 12" single
A1. "Overpowered" – 5:09
A2. "Foolish" – 3:28
A3. "Overpowered" (Kris Menace Remix) – 5:09
B1. "Overpowered" (Seamus Haji Remix) – 8:07
B2. "Overpowered" (Herve Remix)

Digital single
"Overpowered" (Radio Edit) – 3:44

Digital EP 1
"Overpowered" – 5:09
"Foolish" – 3:28
"Sweet Nothings" – 3:43

Digital EP 2
"Overpowered" – 5:08
"Overpowered" (Loose Cannons Mix) – 4:32
"Overpowered" (Kris Menace Remix) – 5:11
"Overpowered" (Seamus Haji Remix) – 8:08
"Overpowered" (Herve and Róisín in the Secret Garden Mix) – 5:27

Digital EP 3
"Overpowered" – 5:09
"Overpowered" (Kris Menace Remix) – 5:09
"Overpowered" (Seamus Haji Remix) – 8:07
"Overpowered" (Herve and Róisín in the Secret Garden Mix) – 5:26

Credits and personnel
Credits adapted from the liner notes of the CD single.

 Róisín Murphy – vocals, production, songwriting
 Tom Elmhirst – mixing
 Scott King – art direction, design
 Dave Okumu – guitar
 Mike Patto – keyboards, songwriting
 Seiji – drums, keyboards, production, songwriting
 Jonathan de Villiers – photography

Charts

References

2007 singles
2007 songs
EMI Records singles
Róisín Murphy songs